The Legislature of Buenos Aires Province is the legislature of Buenos Aires, one of the twenty three provinces that make up Argentina. It is a bicameral body, comprising the Chamber of Deputies (made up of 92 representatives), and the Senate (with 46 representatives).

It is one of eight bicameral legislatures in the country. Members of both houses are elected by proportional representation for four-year terms in eight multi-member constituencies which span the entirety of the province's territory. As in the National Chamber of Deputies and most other provincial legislatures, elections to both houses of the legislature are held every two years, so that half of its members are up in each election.

Both houses of the Legislature convene in the Legislative Palace of Buenos Aires, in the provincial capital of La Plata. The building, a city landmark, was designed by Hannover architects Gustav Heine and Georg Hagemann in 1883 and completed in 1888.

Electoral sections
Members of both houses of the Legislature are elected in eight multi-member districts known as "Electoral Sections" that cover the entirety of the province's territory. The electoral sections are split along the lines of the 135 partidos of Buenos Aires Province; the 8th section (commonly known as the "Capital Electoral Section") corresponds to La Plata Partido only. The electoral sections are governed by electoral law 25,548.

See also

 List of provincial legislatures in Argentina
 Parliament of Argentina

Notes

References

Bicameral legislatures
Government of Argentina
Buenos Aires Province
Buenos Aires